Alice Huyler Ramsey (November 11, 1886 – September 10, 1983) was the first woman to drive an automobile across the United States from coast to coast, a feat she completed on August 7, 1909.

Early life
Ramsey was born Alice Taylor Huyler, the daughter of John Edwin Huyler, a lumber dealer, and Ada Mumford Farr. She attended Vassar College from 1903–1905.  On January 10, 1906, in Hackensack, New Jersey, Ramsey married congressman John R. Ramsey (1862–1933), with whom she had two children:  John Rathbone Ramsey, Jr. (1907–2000) and Alice Valleau Ramsey (1910–2015), who married Robert Stewart Bruns (1906–1981).

Career
In 1908 her husband bought her a new Maxwell runabout. That summer she drove over 6,000 miles near their Hackensack home. In September 1908 she drove one of the three Maxwells which were entered in that year's American Automobile Association's (AAA) Montauk Point endurance race, being one of only two women to participate. One of the other Maxwell drivers was Carl Kelsey, who did publicity for Maxwell-Briscoe. It was during this event that Kelsey proposed that she attempt a transcontinental journey, with Maxwell-Briscoe's backing. The company would supply a 1909 touring car for the journey, and would also provide assistance and parts as needed. The drive was originally meant as a publicity stunt for Maxwell-Briscoe, and would also prove to be part of Maxwell's ongoing strategy of specifically marketing to women. At that time, women were not often encouraged to drive cars.

Transcontinental drive
On June 9, 1909, this 22-year-old housewife and mother began a 3,800-mile journey from Hell Gate in Manhattan, New York, to San Francisco, California, in a green, four-cylinder, 30-horsepower Maxwell DA. On her 59-day trek she was accompanied by two older sisters-in-law and 19 year-old friend Hermine Jahns, none of whom could drive a car. They arrived amid great fanfare on August 7, although about three weeks later than originally planned.

The group of women used maps from the American Automobile Association to make the journey. Only 152 of the 3,600 miles (244 of the 5,767 kilometers) that the group traveled were paved. Over the course of the drive, Ramsey changed 11 tires, cleaned the spark plugs, repaired a broken brake pedal and had to sleep in the car when it was stuck in mud. The women mostly navigated by following the telephone poles with more wires in hopes that they would lead to a town.

Along the way, they crossed the trail of a manhunt for a killer in Nebraska, Ramsey received a case of bedbugs from a Wyoming hotel, and in Nevada they were surrounded by a Native American hunting party with bows and arrows drawn. In San Francisco, crowds awaited them at the St. James Hotel. Ramsey was named the "Woman Motorist of the Century" by AAA in 1960. In later years, she lived in West Covina, California, where in 1961 she wrote and published the story of her journey, Veil, Duster, and Tire Iron. Between 1909 and 1975, Ramsey drove across the country more than 30 times.

After her husband's death in 1933, Ramsey lived with Anna Graham Harris in New Jersey and then later in West Covina, California until Anna's death in 1953, and eventually with Elizabeth Elliott from 1968 until Ramsey's death on September 10, 1983, in Covina, California.

Legacy
On October 17, 2000, Ramsey became the first woman inducted into the Automotive Hall of Fame.

Gallery

See also
Vermont (automobile) – first automobile to cross the United States

References

External links
Hall of Fame: Alice Huyler Ramsey
"People Thought I Was Crazy": Newspaper article about the Alice Ramsey Mural in Reno, Nevada
Alice's Drive, a re-creation of the drive on its 100th anniversary

American automotive pioneers
1886 births
1983 deaths
Vassar College alumni
People from Hackensack, New Jersey
People from Rochester, New York